Christina Sampanidis (born 12 May 1988) is a Serbian female footballer currently playing for ŽFK Mašinac PZP Niš. She represents the Serbia national team, the country of her mother.

Career
Sampanidis began her career with nine years in the youth side for TuRa Wermelskirchen and joined 2001 to TG Hilgen 04. After three years with TG Hilgen 04 signed in July 2004 for his fathers former club PAOK F.C. She won in three years for PAOK F.C. two national championships and moved than to the land of her mother Serbia who signed for ŽFK Mašinac PZP Niš. He played for ŽFK Mašinac 74 games and scored 3 goals in three years, before returning to Germany to sign for Bayer 04 Leverkusen. Without having played a Bundesliga match, on 5 October 2010 resigned her contract with Bayer 04 Leverkusen and returned to ŽFK Mašinac.

International career
She is former Serbia U-19 and since 2007 regular starter for the Serbia women's national football team.

Personal life
Her father Dimitris, a Greek, is a former professional player of PAOK Thessaloniki F.C., while her mother Suzana comes from Serbia.

References

1988 births
Living people
Serbian women's footballers
Serbia women's international footballers
People from Remscheid
Sportspeople from Düsseldorf (region)
German people of Serbian descent
German people of Greek descent
Serbian people of Greek descent
PAOK FC players
German women's footballers
Bayer 04 Leverkusen (women) players
ŽFK Mašinac PZP Niš players
Women's association football defenders
Footballers from North Rhine-Westphalia